OPHS may refer to:
 Oak Park High School (disambiguation)
 Oaks Park High School (disambiguation)
 Office of Public Health and Science, an agency of the United States Department of Health and Human Services
 Orange Park High School, Orange Park, Florida, United States